The Milan Vidmar Memorial is a strong closed chess tournament commemorating 
Milan Vidmar (1885–1962), a leading Slovenian grandmaster.

The tournament has been held mostly in a biannual rhythm in several Slovenian cities, i.e.: Ljubljana, Portorož, Rogaška Slatina, Bled, and Ptuj.

The first Vidmar Memorial was held in 2–20 June 1969 in Ljubljana as an international invitation tournament: Albin Planinc emerged as sensational winner.

The event in 1995 at Ptuj was a Zonal Tournament, with Stefan Kindermann who did win, Viktor Korchnoi, and Thomas Luther earning a spot in a round robin of players from Germany, Austria, Switzerland, and Slovenia to advance (due to the split of FIDE in 1993, the World Chess Championship cycles collapsed and it turned out that there were no longer Interzonals to be held).

From 2007 (17th edition, ten players from Slovenia) to 2011 (19th edition), the Vidmar Memorial claim was occasionally, but not regularly used for the National Chess Championship of Slovenia.

In 2016, the jubilee Vidmar Memorial XX is organised again as an international invitation tournament.

Winners
{| class="sortable wikitable"
! # !! Year !! City !! Winner
|-
|align="center"|1 ||1969 ||Ljubljana||  
|-
|align="center"|2||1973|| Ljubljana, Portorož|| 
|-
|align="center"|3||1975|| Portorož, Ljubljana || 
|-
|align="center"|4||1977|| Ljubljana, Portorož || 
|-
|align="center"|5||1979|| Bled, Portorož || 
|-
|align="center"|6||1985|| Portorož, Ljubljana || ,,
|-
|align="center"|7||1987|| Portorož, Ljubljana || ,
|-
|align="center"|8||1989|| Ljubljana, Rogaška Slatina|| 
|-
|align="center"|9||1991|| Bled, Rogaška Slatina|| 
|-
|10||1993|| Portorož, Rogaška Slatina || 
|-
|11||1995||Ptuj (Zonal)|| 
|-
|12||1997|| Portorož || 
|-
|13||1999|| Portorož || 
|-
|14||2001|| Portorož || 
|-
|15||2003|| Portorož || ,
|-
|16||2005|| Portorož || 
|-
|17||2007|| Ljubljana(National Championship)|| 
|-
|18||2009|| Otočec(National Championship)|| 
|-
|19||2011|| Ljubljana(National Championship)|| 
|-
|20||2016|| Bled || 
|}

References 

XVII dr. Milan Vidmar Memorial-National Championship at fide.com

Chess competitions
Chess in Slovenia
Chess in Yugoslavia
Sport in Ljubljana
1969 in chess
Recurring sporting events established in 1969
Chess memorial tournaments